Virginie Besson-Silla (born 1972) is a Canadian-French film producer. She has made a variety of different films including action films, romantic films, comic adaptations, biographical films and an animation.

Life and career
Silla was born in Ottawa, Ontario, the daughter of a Senegalese diplomat and a French physiotherapist.
She is the sister-in-law of actor Vincent Perez by her sister, Karine Silla, who is an actress and author. 

Since her marriage in 2004 to Luc Besson, Virginie has been known as Virginie Silla-Besson or Virginie Besson-Silla. The couple has three children.

In 2010, Time quoted Luc saying she was a more perfect producer than he was and that she hereby enabled him to focus on directing his artistically most demanding, sumptuous film The Lady (2011).

Filmography
2001: Yamakasi
2002: Peau d'Ange
2003: La Felicita, le bonheur ne coûte rien
2004: À ton image
2005: Au suivant !
2005: Revolver
2006: Love and Other Disasters
2007: The Secret
2010: From Paris with Love
2010: The Extraordinary Adventures of Adèle Blanc-Sec
2011: The Lady
2012: La mécanique du cœur
2013: The Dream Kids
2014: 3 Days to Kill
2014: Lucy
2017: Valerian and the City of a Thousand Planets

References

External links

Virginie Silla at Unifrance 

1972 births
Living people
People from Ottawa
French women film producers
French film producers
French people of Senegalese descent
Canadian women film producers
Film producers from Ontario